GSS may refer to:

Education 
 Garibaldi Secondary School, in Maple Ridge, British Columbia, Canada
 The Gifted Students' School (Iraq), in Baghdad
 Government Secondary School (disambiguation)
 Greenridge Secondary School, in Singapore
 Grimsby Secondary School, in Ontario, Canada
 GSS Institute of Technology, in Bangalore, India
 Gay Student Services, now GLBT Aggies, at Texas A&M University

Government and politics 
 Global Standards Symposium
 Civic Alliance of Serbia, a political party in Serbia
 Government Statistical Service, of the Government of the United Kingdom
 Israeli General Security Service, also known as Shin Bet
 Ghana Statistical Service, of the Government of Ghana

Science 
 General Social Survey
 Genome survey sequence
 Gerstmann–Sträussler–Scheinker syndrome
 Glutathione synthetase
 Granulomatous slack skin
 Gudjonsson suggestibility scale

Sport 
 Grønlands Seminarius Sportklub, a Greenlandic sport club
 Gurpreet Singh Sandhu, an Indian footballer
 Panionios G.S.S., a Greek association football club

Technology 
 Generic Security Services Application Program Interface, an application programming interface for programs to access security services
 Graph Style Sheets
 GSS Infotech, an Indian information technology company
 Graph-structured stack
 Galileo Sensor Station, in satellite navigation

Other uses 
 Croatian Mountain Rescue Service
 Ghost Shadows, a Chinese-American gang
 Global Supply Systems, a British cargo airline
 Good Samaritan Society, a Canadian Lutheran service organization
 Great Singapore Sale, an annual shopping event in Singapore
 Greek Sign Language
 Grupo Silvio Santos, a Brazilian holding company
 Guild of Servants of the Sanctuary, in the Church of England